The Prussian Class P 6s were passenger locomotives operated by the Prussian state railways with a leading axle and three coupled axles.

The P 6 was conceived as a so-called universal locomotive. The first vehicle was manufactured in 1902 at Düsseldorf by the firm of Hohenzollern. This engine has a number of features that are characteristic of its designer, Robert Garbe: a narrow chimney located well forward and the unusual position of the boiler.

The smokebox superheater installed on the first machines was soon replaced by a smoke tube superheater. In all, 275 engines of this class were built up to 1910. 110 examples had to be handed over after the First World War as reparations: 44 to Poland (PKP Oi1), 24 to Belgium, 19 to France (16 to the Nord (3.1551–3.1566), 3 to Alsace-Lorraine), 9 to Italy (FS 626), 6 to Lithuania, 4 to Latvia and 4 to the Territory of the Saar Basin (2101–2104). 163 locomotives were taken over by the Deutsche Reichsbahn as DRG Class 37.0-1, where they were allocated the running numbers 37 001 to 37 163. In 1935 the four Saar locomotives were incorporated into the DRG fleet as 37 164 to 37 167.

The locomotives with numbers 37 201–206 were, by contrast, G 6 and P 6 class engines respectively of Lübeck-Büchen Railway (LBE), that had a different design from the Prussian locomotives.

The Prussian P 6s were retired by about 1950. The few engines left after the Second World War were no longer employed by the Deutsche Bundesbahn and the Reichsbahn.

The locomotives taken over by the Polish State Railways (PKP) were given the designation Oi1.
One of them has been preserved and can be viewed in the Warsaw Railway Museum.
The engines were equipped with Prussian tenders of class pr 2'2' T 16.

See also 
 Prussian state railways
 List of Prussian locomotives and railcars
 List of preserved steam locomotives in Germany

Notes

References

Further reading 

2-6-0 locomotives
P 06
Railway locomotives introduced in 1902
Berliner locomotives
Hohenzollern locomotives
Passenger locomotives
Standard gauge locomotives of Germany
Standard gauge locomotives of Poland
1′C h2 locomotives